"Westering Home" is a song that was written by Hugh S. Roberton in the 1920s. It was subsequently adopted as the slow march of the Royal Navy.

Lyrics
It runs as follows:

Chorus
Westering home, and a song in the air, 
Light in the eye and it's goodbye to care. 
Laughter o' love, and a welcoming there, 
Isle of my heart, my own one.

Verse 1
Tell me o' lands o' the Orient gay, 
Speak o' the riches and joys o' Cathay; 
Eh, but it's grand to be wakin' ilk day 
To find yourself nearer to Islay.

Verse 2
Where are the folk like the folk o' the west? 
Canty and couthy and kindly, the best. 
There I would hie me and there I would rest 
At hame wi' my ain folk in Islay.

Verse 3
Now I'm at home and at home I do lay 
Dreaming of riches that come from Cathay 
I'll hop a good ship and be on my way 
And bring back my fortune to Islay 

"Ilk" means each. "Canty" means neat or trim. "Couthy" means homely, simple, unpretentious. "Islay" is pronounced "Isla".

The tune is a modified version of the traditional "The Muckin o Geordie's Byre", with the time signature changed from 6/8 to 3/4, and the rhythm slightly altered. Roberton appropriated this form of the melody from a Gaelic song with lyrics relating to nostalgia for Skye in the trenches of the First World War, one of several entitled Eilean mo Chrìdh'''. Its English title Isle of my Heart'' features in Roberton's lyric.

References

External links
Entry at the Scottish Poetry Library

Scottish songs
Islay
1920s songs
1920s in Scotland
Songs about Scotland